Special Section  ( Hatouk Bazhin) is an Armenian detective drama television series created by Arriva films. The series premiered on Armenia 1 on December 14, 2015 and comprises 16 episodes. Main directors were Edgar Baghdasaryan and Armen Malakyan, second director was Gohar Igityan, director assistants were Gayane Madatyan, Arusik Ghazaryan and Lilith Gabrielyan. Screenwriter was Harutyun Ghukasyan.
Most of the series took place in Yerevan, Armenia.

Series overview

Cast and characters

Main Cast

Recurring Cast
Arman Ghazaryan
Ani Khachikyan
Armen Margaryan
Tigran Mnatsakanyan
Levs Davtyan
Ishkhan Gharibyan

References

External links
 

Armenian-language television shows
Armenian drama television series
2014 Armenian television series debuts
2010s Armenian television series
2015 Armenian television series endings
Public Television Company of Armenia original programming